The Vault was the fourth studio album to be released by Australian band Ol' 55, released in December 1980, the album peaked at number 41 on the Australian Kent Music Report.

Track listing

Charts

References

1980 albums
Ol' 55 (band) albums